Comerciantes Unidos is a Peruvian football club from Cutervo, Cajamarca. It plays in the Peruvian Segunda Division.

History
Comerciantes Unidos was founded as Los Comerciantes by Abdias Cieza Tapia, Juan Tarrillo Castro, and Jorge Salas Toro in 2001. That year they were promoted to their local district league. In 2002, they became an official club and changed their name to Club Social Deportivo y Cultural Comerciantes Unidos. In 2008, they reached the Copa Perú National Stage for the first time. In 2010, they were invited to participate in La Liga Superior de Cajamarca which groups the best teams from the Cajamarca Region and gives direct access to the Department Stage of the Copa Perú. that same year they reached the National Stage of the Copa Peru once more. 
In 2013, they once more reached the Copa Perú National Stage and were invited to participate in the Peruvian Segunda División.

Comerciantes Unidos played its first season in the Peruvian Segunda División in the neighboring province of Santa Cruz due to their home stadium being remodeled. This was very difficult for the team and their fans. The team finished the season 14th, only 5 points away from relegation. During the 2015 season, Carlos Cortijo, who had won the Segunda División tournament the year before, was hired as the new manager by club president Aníbal Pedraza Aguilar. Comerciantes Unidos was able to once again play its home matches at their local stadium, Estadio Juan Maldonado Gamarra. The club won the tournament on 25 October 2015 after defeating Sport Boys 1-0 at a home match. Comerciantes Unidos had a great debut campaign in the 2016 Torneo Descentralizado where it finished 6th and qualified for the first time to an international tournament, the 2017 Copa Sudamericana.

Colours and badge
Comerciantes Unidos' colours are blue and yellow which can be seen on the club's home and away kits respectively.

The current badge was designed by club fan José Requejo Díaz in 2010. The three stars represent the three times that Comerciantes reached the National Stage of the Copa Perú.

Stadium
Comerciantes Unidos plays their home matches at Estadio Juan Maldonado Gamarra with a capacity for 8,000 spectators.

Current squad

Staff

Honours

National
Peruvian Segunda División:
Winners (1): 2015

Regional 
 Región II:
Winners (2): 2008, 2013
Runner-up (1): 2010

Liga Departamental de Cajamarca:
Winners (1): 2008, 2010
Runner-up (1): 2013

Liga Superior de Cajamarca:
Winners (1): 2010

Liga Provincial de Cutervo:
Winners (2): 2008, 2013

Liga Distrital de Cutervo:
Winners (2): 2008, 2013

External links
 Comerciantes Unidos - official site

References

 
Association football clubs established in 2002
Football clubs in Peru